Edward Thomas  (1700-1753) was Anglican priest in Ireland in the mid 18th century.
 
Thomas was born in Headford and educated at Trinity College, Dublin.  A Prebendary of  Lismore Cathedral, Ireland, he was Archdeacon of Lismore from 1751 until his death in 1753. Thomas is buried in the grounds of Waterford Cathedral.

References

Alumni of Clare College, Cambridge
Archdeacons of Lismore
1753 deaths
18th-century Irish Anglican priests
People from County Galway
1700 births